UK Swedish may refer to:

 Swedes in the United Kingdom
 British immigration to Sweden
 Sweden–United Kingdom relations

Disambiguation pages